Siddhi Idnani (born 10 January 1996) is an Indian actress who appears in Tamil and Telugu language films. She made her acting debut in Telugu movie Jamba Lakidi Pamba (2018). She was critically acclaimed as "Paavai" for her role in a Tamil film Vendhu Thanindhathu Kaadu (2022).

Personal life
Siddhi Idnani was born and brought up in Mumbai, India. Her father, Ashok Idnani, is a voice modulation trainer and her mother, Falguni Dave, is a television actor.

Career
Siddhi Idnani started her career as a theatre artist known for the Gujarati commercial play Aaje Ravivaar Chec. Post that Siddhi become a finalist at Miss Diva, Ahmedabad.

She started her film career with a Gujarati film Grand Hali. She went on to win Miss India super talent and represented India at Miss Supertalent in Paris in 2018.

She debuted in Tollywood with Jamba Lakidi Pamba in June 2018. Her second release, Prema Katha Chitram 2 with Nandita Shweta and Sumanth Ashwin, released in 2019.

She is well known for her role in the Tamil filmVendhu Thanindhathu Kaadu directed by Gautham Vasudev Menon and starring Silambarasan.

Her upcoming films include Nooru Kodi Vaanavil with critically acclaimed director, Sasi. She is known amongst her fans as Dimple Queen.

Filmography

References

External links
 
 
 

Living people
Indian film actresses
21st-century Indian actresses
University of Mumbai alumni
Actresses from Mumbai
Actresses in Gujarati cinema
Actresses in Telugu cinema
1996 births